Darrell Roberts is an American guitarist best known as a former member of the heavy metal bands W.A.S.P. and Five Finger Death Punch.

Career 
In 2002, Roberts debuted as a member of the heavy metal band W.A.S.P. In 2005, he left the band and went on to join Las Vegas based heavy metal band Five Finger Death Punch. Roberts left FFDP in 2009 and was replaced by Jason Hook. In late 2009, he started a new band under the name Sintanic with former Murderdolls drummer Ben Graves.

Discography

Tuff 
History of Tuff (2001) – guitarist on "American Hairband"

W.A.S.P. 
Dying for the World (2002)
The Neon God: Part 1 – The Rise (2004)
The Neon God: Part 2 – The Demise (2004)
Dominator (2007) – song: "Deal with the Devil"

Five Finger Death Punch 
The Way of the Fist (2007)

References

External links 
Darrell Roberts on Myspace

Living people
American heavy metal guitarists
1974 births
American male guitarists
Five Finger Death Punch members
W.A.S.P. members
21st-century American guitarists
21st-century American male musicians